Hold You Tight is a 1998 Hong Kong romantic drama film directed by Stanley Kwan. The film features full-frontal male nudity.

It is Stanley Kwan's seventh feature film, and he says that his previous two documentaries A Personal Memoir of Hong Kong and Yang ± Yin: Gender in Chinese Cinema had strong influences on making this film: "Both of them evolved from my thoughts on family background and upbringing, my career as a filmmaker, my sexual orientation and my identity as a Chinese man living in a British colony. The film was written for Hong Kong actress Chingmy Yau who plays two roles, a young executive and a worldly boutique owner."

Cast
Chingmy Yau as Ah Moon/Rosa Gao
Sunny Chan as Fung Wai
Eric Tsang as Tong
Lawrence Ko as A-che
Sandra Ng Kwan Yue as Video Dealer
Tony Rayns as Rosa's Friend

Awards
In 1998, Hold You Tight won the FIPRESCI Prize — Special Mention and Silver Screen Award for Best Actor at the Singapore International Film Festival, the Golden Horse Award for Best Supporting Actor and the Alfred Bauer Prize and Teddy Award at the 48th Berlin International Film Festival. The following year, it won the Award of the Pestalozzi Children's Village Foundation at the Fribourg International Film Festival and the Film of Merit award at the Hong Kong Film Critics Society Awards.

See also

 List of Hong Kong films of 1998
 List of lesbian, gay, bisexual or transgender-related films
 List of lesbian, gay, bisexual, or transgender-related films by storyline
 Nudity in film (East Asian cinema since 1929)

References

External links

1998 films
1998 romantic drama films
1990s Cantonese-language films
Chinese LGBT-related films
Chinese romantic drama films
Chinese independent films
Films directed by Stanley Kwan
Films set in Hong Kong
Gay-related films
Hong Kong independent films
Hong Kong LGBT-related films
LGBT-related romantic drama films
1998 LGBT-related films
1998 independent films
1990s Hong Kong films